Reddyanus rigidulus is a species of scorpion in the family Buthidae.

References

Animals described in 1897
rigidulus